Borki  is a village in the administrative district of Gmina Gąbin, within Płock County, Masovian Voivodeship, in east-central Poland.

The village has a population of 135.

References

Villages in Płock County